The 2008 Lehigh Mountain Hawks football team was an American football team that represented Lehigh University during the 2008 NCAA Division I FCS football season. Lehigh finished third in the Patriot League. 

In their third year under head coach Andy Coen, the Mountain Hawks compiled a 5–6 record. Kevin Bayani, Tim Diamond, Matt McGowan and Brendan VanAckeren were the team captains.

The Mountain Hawks outscored opponents 282 to 231. Their 4–2 conference record placed third out of seven in the Patriot League standings. 

Lehigh played its home games at Goodman Stadium on the university's Goodman Campus in Bethlehem, Pennsylvania.

Schedule

References

Lehigh
Lehigh Mountain Hawks football seasons
Lehigh Mountain Hawks football